Kosmos 880 ( meaning Cosmos 880) was a satellite which was used as a target for tests of anti-satellite weapons. It was launched by the Soviet Union in 1976 as part of the Dnepropetrovsk Sputnik programme, and used as a target for Kosmos 886, as part of the Istrebitel Sputnikov programme.

It was launched aboard a Kosmos-3M carrier rocket, from Site 132/2 at the Plesetsk Cosmodrome. The launch occurred at 20:00 UTC on 9 December 1976.

It was successfully intercepted and destroyed by Kosmos 886 on 27 December 1976. The last catalogued piece of debris decayed from orbit on 9 December 2001 (although pieces of debris of Kosmos 886, the intercepting device, remain in orbit as of 2023).

Kosmos 880 was the fourth of ten Lira satellites to be launched, of which all but the first were successful. Lira was derived from the earlier DS-P1-M satellite, which it replaced.

See also

1976 in spaceflight

References

1976 in spaceflight
1976 in the Soviet Union
Intentionally destroyed artificial satellites
Satellites formerly orbiting Earth
Kosmos satellites
Spacecraft launched in 1976
Dnepropetrovsk Sputnik program
Spacecraft that broke apart in space